The women's hammer throw event at the 2011 All-Africa Games was held on 12 September.

Results

References
Results
Results

Hammer
2011 in women's athletics